Ferretti Battery, also known as Qajjenza Battery or Saint George's Battery, is an artillery battery in the village of Qajjenza, within the limits of Birżebbuġa, in Malta. It was built by the Order of Saint John between 1715 and 1716 as one of a series of coastal fortifications around the coasts of the Maltese Islands. A restaurant exists within the walls of the battery, serving Mediterranean cuisine.

History
Ferretti Battery was built in 1715-16 as part of the first building programme of coastal batteries in Malta. It was part of a chain of fortifications that defended Marsaxlokk Bay, which also included six other batteries, the large Saint Lucian Tower, two smaller De Redin towers, four redoubts and three entrenchments. The battery was named after the knight Francesco Maria Ferretti, who provided over 900 scudi for its construction.

The battery consists of a semi-circular gun platform, with a parapet containing eight embrasures. Its gorge has two blockhouses linked by a redan, all of which are pierced by musketry loopholes. The redan contains the main entrance, which was surmounted by three coats of arms, now defaced. The battery was formerly covered by a shallow rock hewn ditch.

The battery was decommissioned sometime in the 19th century, and was later converted into a summer residence and a boathouse. The parapet with embrasures was demolished, while the ditch was converted into a moat filled with seawater. A high seawall was built around the battery.

Present day

Today, the battery is used as a restaurant, named Ferretti after the knight who built the battery. The restaurant serves typical Mediterranean cuisine, and is one of the most popular restaurants in the south of Malta.

The structure itself is in a fair state of preservation. Some of the missing embrasures have been rebuilt, and despite some modern alterations, the structure still retains most of its features.

Gallery

References

External links

National Inventory of the Cultural Property of the Maltese Islands
Official website

Batteries in Malta
Hospitaller fortifications in Malta
Military installations established in 1715
Restaurants in Malta
Birżebbuġa
Limestone buildings in Malta
National Inventory of the Cultural Property of the Maltese Islands
18th-century fortifications
1715 establishments in Malta
18th Century military history of Malta